Danny Cepero (born April 22, 1985 in Baldwin, New York) is a former American soccer player.

Playing career

College
Cepero played four years of college soccer at the University of Pennsylvania, where he captained the squad, set Penn's all-time career record for shutouts, and was named to the All-Ivy team in his senior year.

Professional
Cepero was drafted by the New York Red Bulls in the fourth round of the 2007 MLS Supplemental Draft and spent the early part of 2007 balancing his remaining academic duties with his attempts to make the team roster.  On March 26, 2007, the team announced that it had signed Cepero to a developmental contract. Cepero spent some time in the post-season of 2007 training with Dutch side PSV Eindhoven, where he impressed coaches.

Cepero was loaned out to the Harrisburg City Islanders of the USL Second Division in 2008, and while with the City Islanders Cepero established himself as one of the top keepers in USL-2. Following his successful loan stint he was recalled by the Red Bulls.

Cepero made his Red Bulls debut on October 18, 2008, against the Columbus Crew, because of first choice goalkeeper Jon Conway's 10-game suspension for using illegal substances. In the 83rd minute of the game Cepero scored a goal from a free kick deep inside his own half to become the first goalkeeper in MLS history to score a goal from open play.

Cepero was waived by New York on February 12, 2010. He later signed with Harrisburg City Islanders.

It was reported on March 14, 2011 that Cepero retired as a professional soccer player.

Coaching career
After retirement, Cepero joined Florida Gulf Coast University as an assistant men's soccer coach. In February 2013, he joined University of Louisville also as an assistant coach working mostly with goalkeepers. Cepero is currently the Director of Goalkeeping for the New York City FC Academy.

Honors

New York Red Bulls
Major League Soccer Western Conference Championship (1): 2008

References

External links

Louisville bio
Cepero's goal against Columbus
InfoSport Combino bio

1985 births
Living people
Association football goalkeepers
American soccer players
Penn Quakers men's soccer players
New York Red Bulls players
Penn FC players
Philadelphia Union players
USL Second Division players
Major League Soccer players
New York Red Bulls draft picks
New York City FC non-playing staff
New York City FC II non-playing staff
Soccer players from New York (state)
Sportspeople from Nassau County, New York
Florida Gulf Coast Eagles men's soccer coaches
Louisville Cardinals men's soccer coaches